The Tricky Master (千王之王2000) is a 1999 Hong Kong crime comedy film directed by Wong Jing.

Plot
Leung Foon is a happy-go-lucky man with a girlfriend named Pizza and he is a police detective in the Happy Valley Police Station tasked of being a small-time undercover with his superior nicknamed "Thousand Faced Man" but after their undercover case of protecting a millionaire's daughter nearly failed, Leung was tired of taking undercover work and even protested to quit the police force if he's not given a big-time case. Eventually "Thousand Faced" gave Leung the biggest task of bringing a big-time swindler named Ferrari to justice with a promotion being the reward despite Leung failing his "preparedness test".

Leung first starts the investigation by doing what he does best, going undercover as a "invited guest" heading towards Ferrari's beach. As he arrived on the shore, he met First Love, a con woman in disguise of a sweet, cool girl and asking for her phone number (she typed a vulgarity on his mobile phone). After one of Ferrari's henchmen, Fat Pig splashed on Leung at the beach, he was taken to Ferrari's mansion to become one of his security guards.

After Leung realized he was tricked by Ferrari and one of his con women, First Love along with losing his job after Ferrari encrypted all his server's data with a computer virus knowing what was going on when Leung tried to burn a CD with some data from one of his computers to take as evidence, Leung was forced to approach Pizza's brother-in-law Master Wong, a gifted conman whom he and Pizza met in Macau and hated by Leung to learn his skills and become a conman with a vengeance.

Cast
Nick Cheung as Leung Foon
Stephen Chow as Master Wong
Sandra Ng as Wasabi
Kingdom Yuen as Teacher
Tin Kai-Man as Prison guard
Law Kar-ying as Sing
Bowie Wu as Brother Tone
Ken Lo as Lan
Lee Siu-kei as Prison guard
Lee Kin-yan as Guard
Wong Jing as Ferrari
Kelly Lin as First Love
Tats Lau as Leung Foon's superior, "Thousand Faced Man"
Suki Kwan as Pizza
Bobby Yip as Brother 5
Frankie Ng as Prison guard
Samuel Leung
William Duen as Fat Pig
Nancy Lan
Tsang Kan Wing as Uncle Lin
Celia Sze as Rich girl
Aman Chang as Long hair
Bowie Lau as Ken
Chui Chan Wa as Card dealer
Sunny Luk
Andy Tsang
Poon An Ying as Cleaning lady
Cheung Bing Chuen as Kidnapper
Lee Kim Wing as Kidnapper
Leung Kei Hei as Kidnapper
Lee Tat Chiu as Guard
So Wai Nam as Guard
Chow Kam Kong as Guard
Ma Yuk Sing as Guard
Chan Hing Hang
Yuen Man Chun
Chan Kin Yung as Policeman
Lam Kwok Kit
Tam Tin Bo as Mahjong player
Sin Yan Kin as Gambler
Choi Chi Fung as Hon's thug
Keung Hak Shing
Wong Kwan Hong
Wong Siu Keung

Reception
The film grossed HK19,141,640 (US$2.46 million) in Hong Kong.

See also
Tricky Brains, another film directed by Wong Jing centering around trickery

References

External links

The Tricky Master at Hong Kong Cinemagic

1990s crime comedy films
Films directed by Wong Jing
Films about gambling
Hong Kong crime comedy films
1999 comedy films
1999 films
1990s Hong Kong films